The EuroLeague Best Defender is an annual basketball award of the European premier level EuroLeague. It is awarded to the best defensive player throughout the season, up until the EuroLeague Final Four stage of the season. The award began in the 2004–05 season, and the winner is selected by the EuroLeague's head coaches. Dimitris Diamantidis of Panathinaikos Athens, won the first five awards, from 2005 to 2009.

Winners

Notes:
 There was no awarding in the 2019–20, because the season was cancelled due to the coronavirus pandemic in Europe.

Multiple honors

Players

Player nationality

Clubs

References

External links
 EuroLeague Official Web Page
 InterBasket EuroLeague Basketball Forum
 TalkBasket EuroLeague Basketball Forum
 

Best Defender